The 2018–19 Colorado Buffaloes women's basketball team represents the University of Colorado Boulder during the 2018–19 NCAA Division I women's basketball season. The Buffaloes, led by third year head coach JR Payne, play their home games at the CU Events Center and were a member of the Pac-12 Conference. They finished the season 12–18, 2–16 in Pac-12 play to finish in last place. They lost in the first round of the Pac-12 women's tournament to Arizona State.

JR Payne's 2018–19 Colorado team started the Pac-12 conference season 0–11, the worst start to conference competition in program history, before finally winning its first conference game against USC on February 10, 2019. The previous worst conference start in program history was 9 losses to start conference play. Linda Lappe's 2015–16 Colorado team is the only other Colorado team to ever start 0–9 in conference. Lappe was fired at the end of that season.

Roster

Schedule

|-
!colspan=9 style=| Exhibition

|-
!colspan=9 style=| Non-conference regular season

|-
!colspan=9 style=| Pac-12 regular season

|-
!colspan=9 style=|  Pac-12 Women's Tournament

Rankings
2018–19 NCAA Division I women's basketball rankings

See also
2018–19 Colorado Buffaloes men's basketball team

References

Colorado Buffaloes women's basketball seasons
Colorado
Colorado Buffaloes
Colorado Buffaloes